Group C of the 2000 Rugby League World Cup is one of the four groups in the 2000 Rugby League World Cup.

Standings

Matches

Papua New Guinea vs France 

France1. Freddie Banquet, 2. Yacine Dekkiche, 3. Cassin, 4. Dulac, 5. Patrice Benausse, 6. Laurent Frayssinous, 7. Devecchi8. Rachid Hechiche, 9. Wulf, 10. Teixido, 11. Guisset, 12. Tallec, 13. Jampy.Substitutes: El Khalouki, Carrasco, Sands, Despin.

Papua New Guinea1. David Buko, 2. John Wiltshere, 3. Aila, 4. Songoro, 5. Marcus Bai, 6. Stanley Gene, 7. Adrian Lam8. Kahl, 9. Marum, 10. Solbat, 11. Naawi, 12. Mamando, 13. O'Reilly.Substitutes: Mark Mom, Alex Krewanty, Norman, Mondo.

This was the first match of a double-header in Paris for the opening round.

Tonga vs South Africa 

This match formed the second part of the opening round double-header in Paris.

Tonga:1. Paul Koloi, 2. Fifita Moala, 3. Tevita Vaikona, 4. G. Wolfgramm, 5. Lipina Kaufusi, 6. Howlett, 7. W. Wolfgramm8. Martin Masella (c), 9. Esau Mann, 10. Talite Liava'a, 11. Willie Mason, 12. Talou, 13. Duane Mann.Substitutes: David Fisi'iahi, Manu, Nelson Lomi, Kite.

South Africa:1. Tim O'Shea, 2. Brian Best, 3. Leon Barnard, 4. Johnson, 5. Dames, 6. Conrad Breytenbach, 7. Jamie Bloem8. Booysen, 9. Skelton, 10. Powell, 11. Rutgerson, 12. De Villiers, 13. Erasmus.Substitutes: Jennings, Nel, Mulder, Cloete.Coach: Paul Matete

Before the match a statue honouring French rugby league legend, Puig Aubert was unveiled by the French Rugby League Federation at the stadium.

France vs Tonga 

France:1. Freddie Banquet, 2. Jean-Marc Garcia, 3. Cassin, 4. Arnaud Dulac, 5. Claude Sirvent, 6. Fabien Devecchi, 7. Rinaldi8. Hechiche, 9. Wulf, 10. Sands, 11. Jerome Guisset, 12. Tallec, 13. Pascal Jampy.Substitutes: Despin, Carrasco, Sort, Teixido.

Tonga:1. Paul Koloi, 2. Fifita Moala, 3. Vaikona, 4. David Fisi'iahi, 5. L. Kaufusi, 6. Howlett, 7. Nuko Hifo, 8. Martin Masella (c), 9. E. Mann, 10. Liava'a, 11. Willie Mason, 21. Kite, 13. D. Mann.Substitutes: Paul Fisi'iahi, Manu, Nelson Lomi, A. Masella.

Sin Bin: Lomi (25") for flopping.

Papua New Guinea vs South Africa

France vs South Africa

Papua New Guinea vs Tonga

References

External links 
 Rugby League Project

2000 Rugby League World Cup